Standing Up, Falling Down is a comedy film directed by Matt Ratner and written by Peter Hoare. The film stars Billy Crystal, Ben Schwartz, and Eloise Mumford. It premiered at the 2019 Tribeca Film Festival and was released in theaters and on demand on February 21, 2020.

Premise 
When a stand-up comedian is forced to move back to Long Island, he forms an unlikely friendship with an alcoholic dermatologist.

Cast 
 Billy Crystal as Marty
 Ben Schwartz as Scott
 Eloise Mumford as Becky
 Nate Corddry as Adam
 Grace Gummer as Megan
 John Behlmann as Owen
 Jill Hennessy as Vanessa
 David Castañeda as Ruis
 Caitlin McGee as Taylor
 Debra Monk as Jeanie Rollins
 Kevin Dunn as Gary Rollins

Reception 
The website's critics consensus reads: "A familiar story entertainingly told, Standing Up, Falling Down is elevated by the warm chemistry between Billy Crystal and Ben Schwartz." On Metacritic the film has a weighted average score of 70 out of 100, based on 15 critics, indicating "generally favorable reviews".

References

External links 
 

2019 films
American comedy films
2019 comedy films
Films about comedians
Films set in Long Island
2010s English-language films
2010s American films